The ICC Men's Test Cricketer of the Year is an annual award, presented since 2004 by the International Cricket Council to the best Test cricketer over the year in question. It is one of the annual ICC Awards.

Selection
The recipient of the annual award is selected by an "academy" of 56 individuals (expanded from 50 in 2004), including the current national team captains of the Test-playing nations (10), members of the elite panel of ICC umpires and referees (18), and certain prominent former players and cricket correspondents (28). In the event of a tie in the voting, the award is shared.

List of Winners

Wins by player

Wins by country

See also
 ICC Awards

References

Cricket awards and rankings
Sir Garfield Sobers
Awards established in 2004